is a science fiction manga series and an anime series by Osamu Tezuka, based on actual experiments conducted by the Nazis to create secret weapons toward the end of World War II. The anime, which was Tokyo Movie Shinsha's first work, is considered lost, with only episodes 1, 11, and 40-59 known to survive.

Plot
Invited to Nazi Germany during World War II, Dr. Asagumo is asked by Hitler to collaborate in researching the new weapon "Big X". Concerned about the possible effects of this weapon, Dr. Asagumo intentionally delays the progress of the research, conspiring with his co-researcher, the devious Dr. Engel. Immediately before Germany is defeated by the Allies, Dr. Asagumo is shot to death by the German army but not before implanting a card inscribed with the secret of Big X into his son, Shigeru. An organization claiming alliance with the Nazis appears, steals the card from Shigeru, who now lives in Tokyo, and completes the Big X project, which is revealed to be a drug that can expand the human body without limitation. Dr. Engel's grandson has joined the Nazi Alliance. Recovering Big X from the enemy, Shigeru's son Akira fearlessly challenges the Nazi Alliance and Hans Engel, who are plotting to conquer the world.

Voice Cast

 Akira Shimada as Big X
 Fuyumi Shiraishi as Nina
 Ichirô Nagai as Dr. Hanamaru
 Keiko Yamamoto as Hans Engel
 Yoshiko Ota as Akira Asagumo

Other appearances
 Big X makes a cameo appearance in the Astro Boy: Omega Factor game for the Nintendo Game Boy Advance released in 2004, along with many other characters also created by Osamu Tezuka.
 In the Oh My Goddess! manga, Urd watches a thinly veiled parody of the show.
 In the movie Dragon Ball Super: Super Hero the characters Gamma 1 and Gamma 2 wear a suit very similar to Big X.

See also
 List of Osamu Tezuka anime
 List of Osamu Tezuka manga
 Osamu Tezuka's Star System

References

External links
 Big X anime at TezukaOsamu@World (archived)
 Big X in Animemorial
 
 

1963 manga
1964 anime television series debuts
Lost television shows
Osamu Tezuka anime
Osamu Tezuka characters
Shueisha franchises
Osamu Tezuka manga
Science fiction anime and manga
TMS Entertainment
TBS Television (Japan) original programming